The original Switchback Railway was the first roller coaster  at Coney Island in Brooklyn, New York City, and one of the earliest designed for amusement in the United States. The 1885 patent states the invention relates to the gravity double track switchback railway, which had predicated the inclined plane railway, patented in 1878 by Richard Knudsen.  Coney Island's version was designed by LaMarcus Adna Thompson in 1881 and constructed in 1884. It appears Thompson based his design, at least in part, on the Mauch Chunk Switchback Railway which was a coal-mining train that had started carrying passengers as a thrill ride in 1827.

For five cents, riders would climb a tower to board the large bench-like car and were pushed off to coast  down the track to another tower. At the top of the other tower the vehicle was switched to a return track or "switched back" (hence the name).

This track design was soon replaced with an oval complete-circuit ride designed by Charles Alcoke and called the Serpentine Railway. In 1885 Phillip Hinkle developed a lift system which appeared in his ride called Gravity Pleasure. The Gravity Pleasure also featured cars in which the passengers could face forward instead of in the awkward bench-like seats of the first two roller coasters. The next year, Thompson patented his design of coasters that included dark tunnels with painted scenery. Thompson built many more roller coasters under the name "The L.A. Thompson Scenic Railway" across the United States. Some of these operated until 1954.

Other rides 
There was also a switchback railway at the Melbourne Centennial Exhibition in 1888.

References

Roller coasters introduced in 1884
Coney Island
Former roller coasters in New York (state)
Demolished buildings and structures in Brooklyn